The 1928–29 CPHL season was the third season of the Canadian Professional Hockey League, a minor professional ice hockey league in Ontario, Canada, with one team based in Detroit, Michigan and another based in Buffalo, New York. Eight teams participated in the league, and the Windsor Bulldogs won the championship.

Regular season

Playoffs

Semifinals
Best of 3

Toronto 0 @ Detroit 3
Toronto 5 @ Detroit 6

Detroit Olympics beat Toronto Millionaires 2 wins to none.

Kitchener 1 @ Windsor 0
Kitchener 1 @ Windsor 2
Kitchener 0 @ Windsor 4

Windsor Bulldogs beat Kitchener Flying Dutchmen 2 wins to 1.

Final

Best of 5

Windsor 1 @ Detroit 2
Detroit 0 @ Windsor 2
Windsor 0 @ Detroit 2
Detroit 0 @ Windsor 3
Windsor 3 Detroit 1 @ Fort Erie

Windsor Bulldogs beat Detroit Olympics 3 wins to 2.

External links
Season on hockeydb.com

1928 in ice hockey
1929 in ice hockey
1928–29 in Canadian ice hockey by league